Dance, Girl, Dance is a 1940 American comedy-drama film directed by Dorothy Arzner and starring Maureen O'Hara, Louis Hayward, Lucille Ball, and Ralph Bellamy. The film follows two dancers who strive to preserve their own integrity while fighting for their place in the spotlight and for the affections of a wealthy young suitor.

In the decades following its release, the film was subject of critical reassessment and began to garner a reputation as a feminist film. In 2007, it was selected for preservation in the United States National Film Registry by the Library of Congress as being "culturally, historically, or aesthetically significant", describing it as Arzner's "most intriguing film" and a "meditation on the  disparity between art and commerce.

Dance, Girl, Dance was edited by Robert Wise, whose next film as editor was Citizen Kane and who later won Oscars as director of West Side Story and The Sound of Music.

Plot 
While dancing at the Palais Royale in Akron, Ohio, Bubbles, a cynical blonde chorine, and Judy O'Brien, an aspiring young ballerina, meet Jimmy Harris, the scion of a wealthy family. Both women are attracted to Jimmy, a tormented young man who is still in love with his estranged wife, Elinor.

Back in New York, Bubbles finds work in a burlesque club, while Madame Basilova, the girls' teacher and manager, arranges an audition for Judy with ballet impresario Steve Adams. En route to the audition, Madame Basilova is run over by a car and killed, and Judy, intimidated by the other dancers, flees before she can meet Steve. As she leaves the building, Judy shares an elevator with Steve, who offers her a cab ride, but she is unaware of who he is and rejects his offer.

Soon after, Bubbles, now called "Tiger Lily, the burlesque queen", offers Judy a job as her stooge in the Bailey Brothers burlesque show and, desperate, Judy accepts. One night, both Jimmy and Steve attend the performance, and Judy leaves with Jimmy and tears up the card that Steve left for her. The next night, while at a nightclub with Judy, Jimmy has a fistfight with his ex-wife's new husband, and the next day their pictures appear in the newspaper. Bubbles, furious with Judy for stealing Jimmy, appears at the girl's apartment, where she finds Jimmy drunk on the doorstep and sweeps him away to the marriage bureau.

Meanwhile, Steve's secretary, Miss Olmstead, also sees Judy's picture in the paper and identifies her as the dancer who had come to audition. That night, Steve attends Judy's performance at which the audience is given a lecture by Judy about the evils of viewing women as objects. This is followed by a fight between her and Bubbles over Jimmy. Hauled into night court, Judy is sentenced to ten days in jail but is bailed out by Steve. The next day, when Judy goes to meet her benefactor, she recognizes Steve, who hails her as his new discovery and promises to make her a star.

Cast

Release

Box office
The film was a critical and commercial failure, and its theatrical release lost RKO Studios roughly $400,000.

Critical response
Writing for The New York Times, Bosley Crowther panned the film, noting that, "with the exception of Maureen O'Hara, who is sincere but badly miscast, the roles are competently filled and the film pretentiously staged, Dance, Girl, Dance is just a cliché-ridden, garbled repetition of the story of the aches and pains in a dancer's rise to fame and fortune. It's a long involved tale told by a man who stutters...  Nevertheless, it is Miss Ball who brings an occasional zest into the film, especially that appearance in the burlesque temple where she stripteases the Hays office. But it isn't art."

Modern assessment  
Beginning in the 1970s, Dance, Girl, Dance enjoyed a popular revival and critical reassessment. Its resurgence has been ascribed to the burgeoning feminist movement which saw the film as a rare example of empowered women. Critical praise for the film has endured – in 2002 Dance, Girl, Dance was listed among the Top 100 "Essential Films" of the National Society of Film Critics.

Alicia Fletcher, writing for the Toronto International Film Festival, deemed the film "A bone fide feminist masterpiece." Richard Brody of The New Yorker wrote: "The movie lives up to its title—its subject really is dancing. Arzner films it with fascination and enthusiasm, and the choreography is marked by the point of view of the spectators and the dancers’ awareness that they're being watched. Arzner—one of the few women directors in Hollywood—shows women dancers enduring men's slobbering stares. The very raison d’être of these women's performances is to titillate men, and that's where the story's two vectors intersect—art versus commerce and love versus lust. This idealistic paean to the higher realms of creative and romantic fulfillment is harshly realistic about the degradations that women endure in base entertainments."

References

External links
 Dance, Girl, Dance essay by Carrie Rickey at National Film Registry 
 Dance, Girl, Dance essay by Daniel Eagan in America's Film Legacy: The Authoritative Guide to the Landmark Movies in the National Film Registry, A&C Black, 2010 , pages 316-318 
 
   
 
 
 Library of Congress  
 Dorothy Arzner: Queen of Hollywood 
 New York Times - Screen in Review - 1940 
 Dance, Girl, Dance: Gotta Dance an essay by Sheila O’Malley at the Criterion Collection

1940 films
1940s English-language films
American black-and-white films
United States National Film Registry films
Films directed by Dorothy Arzner
RKO Pictures films
American political comedy-drama films
Films about ballet
Films set in New York City
Films produced by Erich Pommer
American feminist films
1940s feminist films
1940s political comedy-drama films
Films scored by Edward Ward (composer)
1940s American films